The 20th Filmfare Awards South Ceremony honoring the winners of the best of South Indian cinema in 1972 was an event held on April 21, 1973 at Shanmukhananda hall in Bombay along with Hindi Awards.

From this year, the awards were regularly presented to four main categories such as Best Film, Best Director, Best Actor and Best Actress in all the four South Indian industries. The president of this year's function was the defence minister Jagjivan Ram. The chief guest of the evening was veteran Ashok Kumar.

Jury

Awards

Kannada cinema

Malayalam cinema

Tamil cinema

Telugu cinema

Special Awards

Awards presentation

 G. V. Iyer (Best Film Kannada) Received Award from Devendra Goel
 S. K. Nair (Best Film Malayalam) Received Award from Sujit Kumar
 G. Hanumantha Rao (Best Film Telugu) Received Award from Deven Varma
 P. Madhavan (Best Film Tamil) Received Award from Rakesh Roshan
 N. T. Rama Rao Receives K. V. Reddy's Award (Best Director Telugu) from G. P. Sippy
 P. Madhavan (Best Director Tamil) Received Award from Farida Jalal
 Kalpana (Best Actress Kannada) Received Award from Jeetendra
 Roja Ramani (Best Actress Malayalam) Received Award from Ajit Wadekar
 Jayalalithaa (Best Actress Telugu) Received Award from Ashok Kumar
 Jayalalithaa (Best Actress Tamil) Received Award from Jairaj
 Venkat Rao Talegiri (Best Actor Kannada) Received Award from Rekha
 Madhu (Best Actor Malayalam) Received Award from Sanjay
 N. T. Rama Rao (Best Actor Telugu) Received Award from Yogeeta Bali
 Sivaji Ganesan (Best Actor Tamil) Received Award from Ashok Kumar

References

 Filmfare Magazine April 6, 1973.
 Filmfare Magazine May 18, 1973.

General

External links
 
 

Filmfare Awards South